Suicide Mission to Singapore (also known as Goldsnake) is a 1966 Italian-Spanish-French Eurospy film written and directed by Ferdinando Baldi. It was the first role as absolute protagonist for Stelio Candelli  (credited as Stanley Kent), who shortly before had appeared in another spy film, Secret Agent 777, as a villain. The theme song "Goldsnake" is performed by Iva Zanicchi.

Cast 
   Stelio Candelli as Kurt Jackson  
   Annabella Incontrera as Evelyne
   Yoko Tani as Annie Wong 
   Juan Cortés as Jean
   Salleh Melan as Gordo

References

External links

1966 films
1960s Italian-language films
Italian spy thriller films
Spanish spy thriller films
French spy thriller films
1960s spy thriller films
Films directed by Ferdinando Baldi
Films set in Singapore
Films shot in Singapore
1960s French films
1960s Italian films
1960s Spanish films